Boyd Chanda (born 19 April 1988) is a retired Zambian football striker.

References

1988 births
Living people
Zambian footballers
Zambia international footballers
Nchanga Rangers F.C. players
CAPS United players
Konkola Mine Police F.C. players
Zambian expatriate footballers
Expatriate footballers in Zimbabwe
Zambian expatriate sportspeople in Zimbabwe
Association football forwards